Evarcha prosimilis is a jumping spider that lives in Zimbabwe.

References

Salticidae
Spiders of Africa
Spiders described in 2008
Endemic fauna of Zimbabwe
Taxa named by Wanda Wesołowska